Malick Touré (born September 22, 1995) is a Malian professional football player. He is currently playing as a left winger.

Club career
Malick Touré joined the Algerian Ligue 1 in the transfers winter 2017–18 with US Biskra, during which he played 8 matches and scored a single goal against DRB Tadjenanet Then, with the team falling to Ligue 2 on June 11, 2018 Touré joined to MO Béjaïa the Malian said on this subject: "It is an honor for me to sign in a club as big as MO Béjaïa. I am therefore delighted to give the maximum to help the club achieve its objectives." On August 11, He made his debut in the Ligue 1 against Olympique de Médéa as a starter and scored his first goal in 4–2 away victory. Touré finished the season with five goals from 28 games, just like last season MO Béjaïa fell to the second division so that he had to search for another club because the law prohibits foreign players from playing in the second division.

On July 16, Malick Touré  joined to ES Sétif for three seasons. He made his debut for the team against USM Alger as a substitute Later in the next round played his first match as a starter against MC Oran in 1–1 draw. Then he waited until round 13 to score his first goal, where he scored a double against AS Aïn M'lila On December 26, followed by another double, this time in the Algerian Cup against AB Chelghoum Laïd in 5–1 victory.

International career
In 2015, Touré was part of the Mali under-20 national team at the 2015 FIFA U-20 World Cup in New Zealand where he participated in six matches. He started in the first match, a 2–0 victory against Mexico, but in the remaining matches he came on as a substitute, with Mali finishing in third place.

Career statistics

Club

Honours

Club
 Club Africain
 Tunisian Ligue Professionnelle 1 (1): 2014–15

References

External links
 Player´s profile, FIFA.com

1995 births
Living people
Malian footballers
Algerian Ligue Professionnelle 1 players
Tunisian Ligue Professionnelle 1 players
Club Africain players
EO Sidi Bouzid players
US Biskra players
MO Béjaïa players
ES Sétif players
Association football midfielders
21st-century Malian people